Sandra Salzgeber (also known as Sandra Kalt) is a Swiss wheelchair tennis player. She represented Switzerland at the 2004 Summer Paralympics. She won the bronze medal together with Karin Suter-Erath in the women's doubles event.

She also competed in the women's singles event.

References

External links 
 

Living people
Year of birth missing (living people)
Place of birth missing (living people)
Paralympic bronze medalists for Switzerland
Wheelchair tennis players at the 2004 Summer Paralympics
Medalists at the 2004 Summer Paralympics
Paralympic medalists in wheelchair tennis